Ravanna Township is a township in Mercer County, in the U.S. state of Missouri.

Ravanna Township was established in 1859, taking its name from the community of Ravanna, Missouri.

References

Townships in Missouri
Townships in Mercer County, Missouri